Varner-Gruppen AS is a textile firm in Norway with approximately 500 stores around the country, including Bik Bok, Carlings, Volt, Cubus, Dressmann, Urban, Levi's Store and WOW. The stores are located throughout Scandinavia, Finland, the Baltic Countries, Germany and Poland. The group has more than 1,100 stores in total.

History
Varner-Gruppen was founded by Frank Varner in 1962 when he opened his first store. Five years later he launched the Dressmann chain. In 1985 the group entered women's clothing, with the launch of Carlings. This was followed by the purchase of Cubus (1989), Bik Bok (1991) and Vivikes (1994). During the later part of the 2000s Varner has had an average store growth of about 80 outlets. The company has since been taken over by Frank Varner's children Marius Varner, Petter Varner and Joakim Varner. The company is privately held and unlisted.

Frank Varner opened his first store on Thorvald Meyersgate in Grünerløkka, Oslo, in 1962. The store was named “Frank Varner” and became a huge success. Three years later, yet another store opened in Oslo and another in Trondheim. In 1967, the name Dressmann was launched in connection with a new store opening on Skippergata in Oslo. Dressmann stores subsequently opened at a record pace all over the country.
At the beginning of the 1980s, the takeover of the stock exchange listed company Jonas Øglænd AS commenced. This was a conglomerate group whose business activities included a bicycle factory, a work-clothing manufacturer, an insurance agency, property development and Norway's largest textile retail chain: the family concept Cubus.

In 1989, Varner acquired an owner's share of more than 90 percent in Jonas Øglænd AS, which thereby became a subsidiary of Varner. The companies that did not naturally fit in with Varner's activities were gradually sold off.

In 1985, the first Carlings store opened on Storgata. The goal was to be the largest Levi's distributor in Oslo. The jeans concept became a success and while Carlings opened increasingly more stores in Norwegian cities throughout the 1980s, Dressmann was in the process of becoming one of the largest retailers in the country.

Dressmann brought in substantial revenues through efficient operations, cost control and in particular, a high sales volume.
In 1991, the company Bik Bok was purchased. Three years later, in 1994, the retail chain Vivikes (now Days Like This) was made a part of Varner. Varner is now represented in the low-price market for men, the volume market for the family, and with a jeans concept for boys, a fashion concept for girls and elegant clothing for women.

In 1995, Petter and Marius Varner take over the management of the company and the development of Varner continues in their hands. In 2001, Varner enters a new market through the acquisition of Urban – a lifestyle store with roots in the skateboard and snowboard scene.
In 2006, the chains WOW and Volt were established. Volt focuses on boys and men between 19–35 years of age, who want clothing that represents both fashion and lifestyle, while the WOW concept offers girls 8–15 years of age everything they desire in the way of clothing and accessories.
Along with the continual establishment of new chains and stores, Varner has become increasingly international. In 2014, Latvia closed all Varner-Gruppen stores. In 2015, Varner is represented in 8 countries. The largest markets outside of Norway are Sweden and Finland.

References

Retail companies of Norway
Wholesalers of Norway
Retail companies established in 1962
1962 establishments in Norway
Companies based in Oslo
Norwegian brands